Reach Island, or Treasure Island, is an island in Case Inlet in the southern part of Puget Sound in the state of Washington, United States. The island's original name was Oak Island, but was later renamed it Reach Island due to its southern neighbor Stretch Island. It forms part of the unincorporated Mason County community of Allyn-Grapeview.

Notable people
Wes Stock, baseball player and coach.

References

External links
Reach Island (Treasure Island): Blocks 6026 thru 6028, Census Tract 9604, Mason County, Washington United States Census Bureau

Islands of Washington (state)
Landforms of Mason County, Washington
Islands of Puget Sound